Brantford was an electoral riding in Ontario, Canada. It was created in 1925 and was abolished in 1996 before the 1999 election.

Boundaries
As part of changes to the Representation Act in 1925, the riding of Brantford was created to include the city of Brantford, the township of Oakland and the part of the township of Brantford south of the Grand River.

Members of Provincial Parliament

References

Former provincial electoral districts of Ontario